Essence is the attribute (or set of attributes) that make an object or substance what it fundamentally is.

Essence may also refer to:

Arts and entertainment

Television and film
The Essence, a short film series by Nathaniel Thompson
"Essence" (The X-Files), a 2001 episode of television show The X-Files

Music
Essence (John Lewis album), 1962
Essence (Don Ellis album), 1962
Essence (Eric Kloss album), 1973
Essence (Shelly Manne album), 1977
Essence, a pseudonym of The Space Brothers, a UK trance music act
Essence (A Guy Called Gerald album), 2000
Essence (Lucinda Williams album), 2001, or the title song
"Essence" (song), a 2020 song by Wizkid featuring Tems

Videogames
a measure of a living being's lifeforce in the role-playing game Shadowrun
the mystical force in the pen and paper role-playing game Exalted

Other uses
Essence (magazine), an African American magazine with a primarily female readership
Essence (Electronic Surveillance System for the Early Notification of Community-based Epidemics), a United States Department of Defense health-protection initiative
Essence (yacht), an American yacht sank in a collision with a cargo ship on 29 April 2009
Essential oil, of a given substance
Extract, used as a food flavoring
an OMG standard on software engineering created by the SEMAT initiative

See also
Esence (disambiguation)